Sollasina is an extinct genus of ophiocistioid that is known from Silurian to Devonian.

Taxonomy

S. Cthulhu from the Coalbrookdale Formation of the Silurian Herefordshire Lagerstätte in England was named after H. P. Lovecraft's fictional cosmic entity, Cthulhu.

See also 
 Echinodermata 
 Holothurian

References

Ophiocistioidea
Prehistoric echinoderm genera